Oswaldo Johnston (27 March 1930 – 16 August 2021) was a Guatemalan wrestler. He competed in two events at the 1952 Summer Olympics.

References

External links
 

1930 births
2021 deaths
Guatemalan male sport wrestlers
Olympic wrestlers of Guatemala
Wrestlers at the 1952 Summer Olympics
Place of birth missing